Rachel Lee (born 8 January 1966), previously known as Loletta Lee, is a Hong Kong actress and a Category III film star.

She started playing small roles in Hong Kong movies in the 1980s. Her first role as a lead actress was in Devoted to You. After secondary school, she continued to play young teenagers in the 1980s until 1990. In the early 90s she actively participated in erotic comedy films such as Sex and Zen 2 and Crazy Love. Due to her age she can only be found today working in mainstream Hong Kong cinema. Her performance in Ordinary Heroes earned her a Golden Horse Award in 1999 for Best Actress.

In an interview with FHM, Lee revealed that her parents were Indonesian Hakka of Meixian ancestry.

Partial filmography
Shanghai Blues 上海之夜 (1984)
Merry Christmas 聖誕快樂 (1984)
Everlasting Love 停不了的愛 (1984)
Happy Ghost 開心鬼 (1984)
Black Thunderstorm TORMENTA NEGRA (1984)
Jazz of the Poker JAZZ DEL POKER (1985)
Flying Mr. B 鬼馬飛人 (1985)
My Family 八喜臨門 (1986)
It's a Mad, Mad, Mad World 富貴逼人 (1987)
Final Victory 最後勝利 (1987)
You OK, I'm OK  你OK,我OK (1987)
Bless this House 猛鬼佛跳牆 (1988)
It's a Mad, Mad, Mad World II 富貴再逼人 (1988)
Mr. Vampire Saga Four 殭屍叔叔 (1988)
It's a Mad, Mad, Mad World III 富貴再三逼人 (1989)
Happy Ghost 4 開心鬼救開心鬼 (1990)
The Dragon From Russia 紅場飛龍 (1990)
Saga of the Phoenix 阿修羅 (1990)
The Banquet 豪門夜宴 (1991)
The 10,000 Bullets LAS 10.000 BALAS (1991)
Shanghai 1920 上海1920 (1991)
The Musical Vampire 音樂殭屍 (1992)
All's Well, Ends Well 家有囍事 (1992)
It's a Mad, Mad, Mad World Too 富貴黃金屋 (1992)
The Greed of Man 大時代 (1993) (TVB Series)
Pink Bomb 人生得意衰盡歡 (1993)
Legend of the Liquid Sword 笑俠楚留香 (1993)
Angel Of The Road 馬路天使 (1993)
Crazy Love 蜜桃成熟時 (1993)
Girls Unbutton 不扣钮的女孩 (1994)
Tricky Business 最后勝利 (1995) (Screenplay)
Sex & Zen 2 玉蒲團2之玉女心經 (1996)
Once Upon a Time in Triad Society 旺角揸fit人 (1996)
Bloody Friday 血腥Friday (1996)
Those were the Days 四個32A和一個香蕉少年 (1996)
Ordinary Heroes 千言萬語 (1999)
War of Genders 男親女愛 (2000)
Killing End 殺科 (2001)
Chinese Paladin 仙劍奇俠傳 (2004)
A Wondrous Bet 魔幻賭船 (2005)
Red River 紅河 (2009)
Magic to Win 開心魔法 (2011)
Never Dance Alone 女人俱樂部 (2014) (TV series)
Invincible Dragon 九龍不敗 (2019)
Find Your Voice 熱血合唱團 (2019)
 Drifting 濁水漂流 (2021)

Partial discography
Truly Clean (1994) (97129-2 MIM-9416C) with Ricky Ho, Belinda Foo, Iskandar Ismail (keyboards), Eddie Marzuki, Jonathan Koh, Shah Tahir (guitars), Stephen Rufus (saxophone), Larry Lai (flute), and Jimmy Lee (cymbals).

References

External links
 
 HK cinemagic entry
 loveHKfilm entry

Living people
Hong Kong film actresses
Hong Kong people of Hakka descent
People from Meixian District
Hong Kong television actresses
20th-century Hong Kong actresses
21st-century Hong Kong actresses
1966 births